Anthocoma may refer to:

Anthocoma (moth), a genus of moths in the subfamily Oecophorinae
Anthocoma (plant), a genus of plants in the family Lamiaceae